Little Dipper is a wooden roller coaster located at Six Flags Great America in Gurnee, Illinois. It was originally built in 1950 by Philadelphia Toboggan Coasters and previously operated at Kiddieland Amusement Park in Melrose Park, Illinois until the park closed in September 2009. On November 24, 2009, Six Flags Great America purchased the ride for $33,000 at an auction. The ride was relocated and reopened on May 27, 2010, in its original configuration within the Yukon Territory section of Six Flags Great America.

References 

Roller coasters in Illinois
Roller coasters operated by Six Flags
Six Flags Great America
Amusement rides that closed in 2009
Roller coasters introduced in 2010
Roller coasters introduced in 1950